Transmissions from Eville (1994) is the first album by Acumen Nation. The original version was released under the name Acumen on Robot Records in 1994. The record was later re-released, in a significantly altered form, by Fifth Colvmn Records on February 14, 1995, then re-released again by Conscience Records on May 12, 1998.

Track listings

Robot Records release
 "Matador" – 6:04
 "Eville" – 5:03
 "Frozen Shallow" – 4:40
 "The Worms" – 3:50
 "Father in the Wall" – 4:56
 "Noarmsnolegs" – 5:15
 "Sutures" – 8:33
 "Gun Lover '94" / "Ultraviolent" – 9:18

"Ultraviolent" is not on the track listing. "Frozen Shallow" later appears on the Iron Lung Corp. album Big Shiny Spears.

Fifth Column and Conscience Records releases
 "Initialize Transmission/Matador" – 6:24
 "Eville" – 5:19
 "Gun Lover" – 4:13
 "The Worms" – 3:48
 "F.W.M." – 4:39
 "Father in the Wall" – 4:57
 "Noarmsnolegs" – 5:14
 "Anchorite" – 3:25
 "Chameleon Skin" – 9:22
 "Sutures" – 8:28
 "Finalize Transmission" – 3:32
 "Matador (Remix)" – 6:17
 "Gun Lover (Remix)" – 4:48
 "Ultraviolent" – 4:30

Tracks 12-14 are available only on the Conscience Records re-release. "Ultraviolent" is taken from the original demo. "The Worms" is misspelled as "The Words" on the re-release.

All songs written and arranged by Jason Novak, except tracks 4 & 6, music co-written by Ethan Novak.

Personnel
Jason Novak – vocals, programming, backing guitars, 
Gregory A. Lopez – bass guitar, live drums on tracks 4 & 5
Ethan Novak – guitars, live drums on tracks 2, 3, 8, 9, & 10

References

1994 debut albums
Acumen Nation albums